Rewan Amin (born 8 January 1996) is an Iraqi Kurdish professional footballer who plays as a defensive midfielder for Duhok and the Iraq national team.

Club career
Born in Dohuk, Iraq, Amin and his family migrated to the Dutch city of Leeuwarden when he was three. Three years later, he joined the youth setup of LAC Frisia 1883, before switching to the academy of Heerenveen six years later. In 2013, he signed a three-year contract extension with the club. In March 2013, reports emerged of English club Arsenal expressing their desire to sign him.

In the pre-season of 2014–15, Amin injured his right knee. In the first match after his recovery, Amin was again injured against FC Groningen. Even though he recovered after the winter break, Amin was again injured, this time in a workout which ruled him out of play for eight weeks. On 12 May 2016, his contract was extended for another season.

Although Amin played 32 times for the reserves, he failed to make a first team debut at Heerenveen. On 2 February 2017, he moved to Swedish second tier club Dalkurd FF, after agreeing to a three-year contract. The same season, Dalkurd won a promotion to Allsvenskan, Sweden's top tier.

On 11 August 2018, Rewan Amin transferred to fellow Allsvenskan side Östersunds FK for an undisclosed fee, on a contract running until 2021. In total, Amin played 49 competitive games for Dalkurd, providing eight assists.

In January 2022, Amin terminated his contract with Ostersunds after a spell dictated by injuries and is now looking for a new club.

International career
Amin scored a goal in his debut for the Netherlands under-15 team. In 2012, he was called to the Netherlands under-17 by Albert Stuivenberg. He was appointed as the captain and went on to play 10 matches for the team.

On 12 September 2022, Amin was called up by Radhi Shenaishil to represent Iraq in the 2022 Jordan International Tournament, representing his country of birth. He was named on the bench in the semi-final against Oman.

Career statistics

Honours

International
Iraq
 Arabian Gulf Cup: 2023

References

External links

Netherlands U17 stats at OnsOranje

1996 births
Living people
People from Duhok
Iraqi footballers
Iraq international footballers
Dutch footballers
Netherlands youth international footballers
Iraqi emigrants to the Netherlands
Iraqi Kurdish people
Dutch people of Iraqi descent
Dutch people of Kurdish descent
Kurdish sportspeople
Association football midfielders
SC Heerenveen players
Dalkurd FF players
Östersunds FK players
Eredivisie players
Superettan players
Allsvenskan players
Expatriate footballers in Sweden
Dutch expatriate sportspeople in Sweden